Mason Cox (born March 14, 1991) is an American-Australian professional Australian rules footballer who plays for the Collingwood Football Club in the Australian Football League (AFL). Playing as a ruckman and key forward, he first played Australian rules football in April 2014 before making his AFL debut two years later in April 2016. Cox had previously played basketball for Oklahoma State University in the Big 12 Conference and, standing at 211 cm (6 ft 10in), is the tallest player to ever be measured at an AFL Draft Combine.

Early life
Cox was born in Highland Village, a suburb of Dallas, Texas, U.S., to parents Jeanette and Phil, the youngest of their three sons. Cox was a student at Edward S. Marcus High School in Flower Mound, Texas, and was part of the school's state championship-winning soccer team. One of his schoolmates at Marcus, and teammates in college, was future Boston Celtics player Marcus Smart.

Cox studied engineering at Oklahoma State University, graduating in 2014. While studying, he started playing basketball as a hobby. He initially joined the Oklahoma State Cowgirls' "scout team" to simulate Brittney Griner, former Baylor University basketball player. After being noticed by former head coach Travis Ford, he was asked to join the university's men's basketball team as a walk-on. He played a total of 57 minutes for the Cowboys, scoring seven points. One of his highlights while playing NCAA Division I basketball was shutting down future National Basketball Association star Joel Embiid while defending him.

Recruitment 
Cox was invited to attend the 2014 US International Combine for potential Australian rules footballers, in Los Angeles in April 2014. After impressive performances in the skills testing, he travelled to Australia for a second combine and on May 30, 2014, was signed by the Collingwood Football Club. AFL teams Port Adelaide, North Melbourne, Richmond, and Fremantle were also reported as having shown interest in recruiting Cox.

Cox played for the Collingwood reserves team in the Victorian Football League (VFL) throughout the 2015 season whilst learning the game and improving his skills.

Cox became known for his goal kicking accuracy in the VFL, being ranked equal 10th. Cox shone in the 2016 NAB Challenge pre-season series showing his ability to compete at that level kicking 2 goals against Geelong, his ability to take contested marks and average a goal a game across both the VFL and AFL drew notice. Despite his strong showing at AFL level in the NAB Challenge, he was not elevated at the start of the season and returned to VFL level for the premiership season.

Cox played well in the opening two games of the 2016 VFL season including a dominant performance up forward against Port Melbourne and as such earned a long awaited call up to the AFL.

AFL career
Cox made his AFL debut on April 25, 2016, in the annual Anzac Day match against Essendon. Within the first 80 seconds of the match, he took his first mark and scored the game's first goal with his first kick in the AFL. Collingwood went on to win the match by 69 points.

On September 11, 2017, despite interest from other clubs, Cox signed a three-year contract extension, keeping him at Collingwood until the end of 2020. Cox continued his good form in the 2018 season, kicking a career-high 5 goals in the Queen's Birthday match at the MCG and was awarded the Neale Daniher trophy as Best on Ground.

In the 2018 Preliminary Final against Richmond, he played a man-of-the-match performance, kicking three goals consecutively and taking many contested marks; Bruce McAvaney remarked "what has Collingwood unleashed" when talking about Mason's performance.

In the 2018 Grand Final, he kicked 2 goals during the 3rd quarter and took many contested marks while playing in Collingwood's loss.

Cox has received special dispensation from the AFL to wear prescription sunglasses in competition. Cox suffered a torn retina in one eye due to an accidental eye poke in a 2019 game against Gold Coast Suns and a detached retina in the other eye after an on-field altercation in the 2018 Grand Final. He has had six eye surgeries in his career. After the 2019 injury, Cox said he had to spend two weeks in bed in a darkened room for 45 minutes of each hour, calling it "probably the darkest moment of my life."

Cox was seeking permanent resident status on a path towards Australian citizenship to fulfill his desire to live the rest of his life in Australia, committing to a multi-year contract at Collingwood. At the end of March 2020, he was accepted to become an Australian citizen. Cox became a citizen of Australia on June 22, 2022 at a special citizenship ceremony at the MCG along with over one hundred conferees.

Statistics
Updated to the end of the 2022 season.

|-
| 2015 ||  || 46
| 0 || — || — || — || — || — || — || — || — || — || — || — || — || — || — || — || — || —
|- 
| 2016 ||  || 46
| 11 || 17 || 7 || 50 || 32 || 82 || 30 || 24 || 79 || 1.6 || 0.6 || 4.6 || 2.9 || 7.5 || 2.7 || 2.2 || 7.2 || 1
|-
| 2017 ||  || 46
| 9 || 10 || 5 || 38 || 32 || 70 || 29 || 23 || 145 || 1.1 || 0.6 || 4.2 || 3.6 || 7.8 || 3.2 || 2.6 || 16.1 || 0
|- 
| 2018 ||  || 46
| 24 || 25 || 12 || 148 || 89 || 237 || 119 || 38 || 164 || 1.0 || 0.5 || 6.2 || 3.7 || 9.9 || 5.0 || 1.6 || 6.8 || 3
|-
| 2019 ||  || 46
| 14 || 19 || 10 || 78 || 49 || 127 || 60 || 11 || 56 || 1.4 || 0.7 || 5.6 || 3.5 || 9.1 || 4.3 || 0.8 || 4.0 || 0
|- 
| 2020 ||  || 46
| 11 || 14 || 2 || 38 || 31 || 69 || 35 || 6 || 34 || 1.3 || 0.2 || 3.5 || 2.8 || 6.3 || 3.2 || 0.5 || 3.0 || 0
|-
| 2021 ||  || 46
| 7 || 8 || 8 || 41 || 25 || 66 || 26 || 7 || 23 || 1.1 || 1.1 || 5.9 || 3.6 || 9.4 || 3.7 || 1.0 || 3.3 || 0
|-
| 2022 ||  || 46
| 18 || 7 || 8 || 112 || 40 || 152 || 58 || 36 || 317 || 0.4 || 0.4 || 6.2 || 2.2 || 8.4 || 3.2 || 2.0 || 17.6 || 1
|- class=sortbottom
! colspan=3 | Career
! 94 !! 100 !! 52 !! 505 !! 298 !! 803 !! 357 !! 145 !! 818 !! 1.1 !! 0.6 !! 5.4 !! 3.2 !! 8.5 !! 3.8 !! 1.5 !! 8.7 !! 5
|}

Notes

Honours and achievements
Individual
 Neale Daniher Trophy: 2018

Personal life
Mason's older brothers also now play Australian rules. Nolan played the USAFL National Championships team Austin Crows and has also represented the USA Revolution national team. Austin plays for USAFL club the Seattle Grizzlies. Mason has expressed a keen interest in promoting the game at the grassroots in the US, visiting the US to support his brothers at the USAFL National Championships.

References

External links

 Mason Cox's profile at OSU Cowboys

1991 births
Living people
People from Denton County, Texas
Sportspeople from the Dallas–Fort Worth metroplex
American men's basketball players
Oklahoma State Cowboys basketball players
American players of Australian rules football
VFL/AFL players born outside Australia
Collingwood Football Club players
Naturalised citizens of Australia
American expatriate sportspeople in Australia